Anabel Gambero Erdozain (born July 9, 1972) is a former field hockey defender from Argentina, who won the silver medal with the women's national team at the 2000 Summer Olympics in Sydney, Australia.

Notes

External links
 
 

1972 births
Living people
Argentine female field hockey players
Las Leonas players
Field hockey players at the 1996 Summer Olympics
Field hockey players at the 2000 Summer Olympics
Olympic field hockey players of Argentina
Olympic silver medalists for Argentina
Place of birth missing (living people)
Olympic medalists in field hockey
Medalists at the 2000 Summer Olympics
Pan American Games gold medalists for Argentina
Pan American Games medalists in field hockey
Field hockey players at the 1991 Pan American Games
Field hockey players at the 1995 Pan American Games
Field hockey players at the 1999 Pan American Games
Medalists at the 1995 Pan American Games
Medalists at the 1991 Pan American Games
Medalists at the 1999 Pan American Games
20th-century Argentine women
21st-century Argentine women